Wang Zihao (born 17 August 1994) is a Chinese professional footballer who currently plays as a midfielder for Jinan Xingzhou.

Club career
Wang Zihao was born in Hebei and he started his professional football career in 2011 when he joined Hebei Zhongji for the 2011 China League Two campaign. The following season in 2012, he joined another China League Two club in Hebei Youth. Wang would move to a China League One club in Shijiazhuang Ever Bright in 2013. He would go on to become a regular within the team and would gain promotion to the top tier with the club at the end of the 2014 China League One campaign.

On 26 September 2015, he made his top tier debut for Shijiazhuang in the 2015 Chinese Super League against Shanghai Shenhua, coming on as a substitute for Eiður Guðjohnsen in the 91st minute. Unfortunately he would be part of the team that was relegated the following season, however by the 2019 league season he would help the team gain promotion back into the top tier.

Career statistics 
Statistics accurate as of match played 31 December 2020.

References

External links
 

1994 births
Living people
Chinese footballers
Footballers from Hebei
Hebei F.C. players
Cangzhou Mighty Lions F.C. players
Chinese Super League players
China League One players
China League Two players
Association football midfielders